Erta Ale Range is the most important axial volcanic chain of the Afar Depression, Afar Region, Ethiopia. It consists mostly of shield volcanoes.

The active volcano Erta Ale is a prominent feature of the range. Other named peaks (with their elevations) include Alu, Dalaffilla and Borale Ale.

Erta Ale 
Its perpetually active pit craters are renowned for their churning lava lakes.

See also
Geography of Ethiopia
List of volcanoes in Ethiopia

References

Further reading 

Mountain ranges of Ethiopia
Natural disasters in Ethiopia
Afar Region